Brian Wright is an American football coach and former player. He is the head football coach at Pittsburg State University in Pittsburg, Kansas, a position he has held since December 2019. Wright was previously and was the offensive coordinator and quarterbacks coach at the University of Toledo and has had coaching stops at The College of Wooster, Walsh University, Youngstown State University, Montana State University, Florida Atlantic University. He served as the interim head coach at Florida Atlantic for the final four games of the 2013 season, leading them to four straight wins and bowl eligibility.

Playing career
Wright played wide receiver at the College of Wooster from 1991 to 1994, before a career ending injury ended his senior season, allowing him to serve as a student assistant coach.

Coaching career
Wright began his coaching career in 1994, as a student assistant during his senior year at Wooster, following a career ending injury. He worked with the wide receivers. For the 1995 and 1996 seasons, Wright was a graduate assistant at Walsh University in Ohio. In 1997. Wright was a graduate assistant for Youngstown State. He worked with the wide receivers.

Wright then returned to Walsh as the wide receivers coach in 1998. In 1999, he moved to quarterbacks coach and added co-special teams coordinator to his responsibilities. In 2000, Wright was promoted to offensive coordinator while continuing to coach quarterbacks.

From 2001 to 2004, Wright coached the quarterbacks at Youngstown State. Prior to the 2005 season, he was promoted to offensive coordinator, a position he held through the 2009 season. From 2004 to 2007, he was also the recruiting coordinator for Youngstown State.

In 2010 and 2011, Wright was the offensive coordinator for the Bobcats of Montana State. In 2012, Wright joined the Florida Atlantic football staff as offensive coordinator and quarterbacks coach, positions he held his entire time there, from 2012 to 2015. Wright served as the interim head coach for the final four games of the 2013 season, leading the Owls to a 4–0 mark, and going 3–0 in Conference USA play. The owls finished the season 6–6 overall, reaching bowl eligibility for the first time since 2008. Wright was made associate head coach along with his coordinator and quarterback responsibilities for the 2014 and 2015 seasons.

In 2016, Wright moved to the University of Toledo to be the offensive coordinator and quarterbacks coach. On December 7, 2019, Wright was named the head football coach at Pittsburg State University in Pittsburg, Kansas.

Personal life
Wright attended Wooster High School in Wooster, Ohio, and earned his bachelor's degree in business from The College of Wooster in 1994 and his master's degree in education from Walsh University in 1998. He and his wife Laura have three children, Jake, Marielle, and Joseph.

Head coaching record

Notes

References

External links
 Pittsburg State profile

Year of birth missing (living people)
Living people
American football wide receivers
Florida Atlantic Owls football coaches
Montana State Bobcats football coaches
Pittsburg State Gorillas football coaches
Toledo Rockets football coaches
Walsh Cavaliers football coaches
Wooster Fighting Scots football coaches
Wooster Fighting Scots football players
Youngstown State Penguins football coaches
Walsh University alumni